Finland has submitted thirty-five films for consideration in the Academy Award for Best International Feature Film category. The Award is handed out annually by the United States Academy of Motion Picture Arts and Sciences to a feature-length motion picture produced outside the United States that contains primarily non-English dialogue.

The Finnish Academy Awards submission is selected by an expert jury which is chosen by the Finnish Film Foundation.

All films listed below were accepted by AMPAS, although two films- Drifting Clouds and Lights in the Dusk- were withdrawn by director Aki Kaurismäki after the films were sent to Hollywood in both 1996 and 2006. According to Mark Johnson, the chairman of the academy's foreign-language committee, he was told by the Finnish selection committee that Kaurismäki does not like film competitions. Only one Finnish film has been nominated for the Foreign Film Oscar, The Man Without a Past, which is directed by Kaurismäki. Kaurismäki boycotted the Academy Awards ceremony as protest over the U.S. involvement in the 2003 invasion of Iraq.

Because of Kaurismäki's withdrawals, Klaus Härö has represented Finland more than any other Finnish director - four times.

Submissions
The Academy of Motion Picture Arts and Sciences has invited the film industries of various countries to submit their best film for the Academy Award for Best Foreign Language Film since 1956. The Foreign Language Film Award Committee oversees the process and reviews all the submitted films. Following this, they vote via secret ballot to determine the five nominees for the award. Below is a list of the films that have been submitted by Finland for review by the academy for the award by the year of the submission and the respective Academy Award ceremony.

All films were in Finnish except for their 2000 submission Seven Songs from the Tundra which was in Nenets and 2011 submission Le Havre  which was in French. Their 2003 & 2005 submissions were half in Swedish (also an official language of Finland), and their 1973 submission was in a Finnish dialect native to the Northern part of the country. The 2015 submission was in Estonian.

See also
List of Academy Award winners and nominees for Best Foreign Language Film
List of Academy Award-winning foreign language films
Cinema of Finland

Notes

References

External links
The Official Academy Awards Database
The Motion Picture Credits Database
IMDb Academy Awards Page

Finland
Academy Award for Best Foreign Language Film